North Rigton is a village and civil parish in the Harrogate district of North Yorkshire, England. The population of the parish was 460 in 2011. Almscliffe Crag adjacent to the village was used for scenery at the end of Yorkshire Television dramas, The Beiderbecke Affair, The Beiderbecke Tapes and The Beiderbecke Connection. The area was never referred to by name.

Until the 19th century the village was known as Rigton, the official name of the parish until 1962. The name is from the Old English hrycg and tūn, meaning "farmstead on the ridge". The place was mentioned in the Domesday Book as Riston, an Anglo-Norman spelling of the name.

The village was historically a township in the parish of Kirkby Overblow, in the West Riding of Yorkshire.  It became a separate civil parish in 1866, and was transferred to the new county of North Yorkshire in 1974.

References

External links

 Village website

Villages in North Yorkshire
Civil parishes in North Yorkshire